, born March 8, 1971, is a Japanese yaoi manga artist. Although Nitta was already a fan of manga, she was introduced to yaoi manga when she was in grade five, by an older girl who was her neighbour.  Her first manga story, "GROUPIE", was published by Biblos in 1997.  She believes in characters not always having to be the seme or uke, and her Embracing Love has been called the first title available with a "reversible" couple in English. In 2008 it was reported that Nitta had infringed upon the copyright of advertising photographs by tracing them for illustrations in her manga Embracing Love; she subsequently apologized for the misuse, as did her publisher. Nitta attended the 2002 Yaoi-Con and the 2006 New York Comic Con but cancelled her planned appearance at the 2008 Yaoi-Con in the aftermath of the tracing scandal.

Bibliography
 Groupie, 1997, 1 volume
  Series, 1997, 9 volumes
Series includes When a Man Loves a Man (1 volume), Last Waltz (2 volumes), Nightcap (1 volume), Irokoi (3 volumes), and U:V (2 volumes)

 , 1997, 14 volumes
Licensed in English as Embracing Love by Be Beautiful

 , 1998, 1 volume
Licensed in English as White Brand by Juné

 , 1998, 2 volumes
 , 1999, 1 volume
Licensed in English as Casino Lilly by Be Beautiful, but never released

 17 Guyz, 2000, 1 volume
 Kiss of Fire (Embracing Love artbook), 2004, 1 volume
Licensed in English as Kiss of Fire by Digital Manga Publishing

 , 2004, 3 volumes (ongoing)
Licensed in English as Sound of My Voice by Be Beautiful

 , 2006, 1 volume
 , 2006, 2 volumes (ongoing)
Licensed in English as The Prime Minister's Secret Diplomacy by 801 Media

 , 2007, 2 volumes (ongoing)
Licensed in English as Otodama: Voice From the Dead by DokiDoki

References

Living people
Manga artists
1971 births